The Southern Kings were a South African professional rugby union team that competed in Super Rugby and Pro14.  They were based in Port Elizabeth in the Eastern Cape province and played their home matches at Nelson Mandela Bay Stadium.  They were created in 2009, and had their first match against the British & Irish Lions during their 2009 tour.  After competing in Super Rugby in 2013, 2016 and 2017, they joined Pro14 prior to the 2017–18 season, along with the Cheetahs.

However, after the South African Rugby Union took over the running of the franchise in November 2015, the franchise had no formal ties to any of the provincial unions.

The team was disbanded in September 2020 after going into voluntary liquidation.

History

Southern Spears

In 2005, there was an attempt to bring a Super Rugby side to the Eastern Cape province in the form of the Southern Spears, who were intended to participate in the Super 14 from 2007 onwards; however, their proposed entry into the competition led to considerable controversy within the country's rugby establishment. In April 2006, after concerns over the team's financial stability and sporting competitiveness, the Spears were denied entry into the Super 14. Following this, the Southern Spears ceased to exist.

Formation and first fixtures

In January 2009, SARU announced that a new franchise in the Eastern Cape Province would be launched in June of that year to coincide with the arrival of the British & Irish Lions in Port Elizabeth for one of their midweek tour matches. The franchise was launched with the goal of a future place in Super Rugby, but no timetable was initially set. The President of the Eastern Province Rugby Union, Cheeky Watson, said "there is a desperate hunger for top-flight rugby in the South Eastern Cape and this is the first step to satisfying it." The franchise was officially announced in April 2009. They played their first match against the British & Irish Lions on 16 June 2009, losing 8–20 in a midweek match in Port Elizabeth. The team's first points were scored by Jaco van der Westhuyzen and their first try was scored by Mpho Mbiyozo.

They also played in the 2011 IRB Nations Cup, where they participated as the South African Kings.

Super Rugby inclusion

On 19 May 2009, Super Rugby governing body SANZAR announced that the existing Super 14 competition would be expanded to 15 teams from the 2011 season onwards. The expansion would participate in the Australian Conference, but was open to tenders from all territories, with teams from Australia, New Zealand and South Africa expressing an interest. This was eventually reduced to just two bidders, the Melbourne Rebels and the Southern Kings. On 11 November 2009, SANZAR arbitrators awarded the 15th licence to the Melbourne Rebels, with geographical location and commercial value swaying the decision in the Australian franchise's favour.

The South African Rugby Union were undeterred in their effort to bring Super Rugby to the Eastern Cape and on 27 January 2012, they confirmed that the Kings would participate in the 2013 Super Rugby season. They also announced that two-legged promotion/relegation play-off series would be played between the lowest-placed South African side in Super Rugby and the non-participating franchise every season.

2013 : Super Rugby

The Kings won the game 22–10, with Sergeal Petersen scoring two tries and Demetri Catrakilis contributing twelve points with the boot. They lost their next two home matches to the Sharks and the  before embarking on their tour of Australasia. The Kings beat the  34–27 in their next match to secure their first ever bonus point victory, but lost their last five matches of the season, losing to the Cheetahs, and the  before the international break, and to the Bulls, Stormers and Sharks when the season resumed.

The Kings' top try scorer in the competition was Wimpie van der Walt, who got six tries and their top points scorer was Demetri Catrakilis, who scored 151 points. The Lions beat the Kings 26–19 in Port Elizabeth in the first leg, but bounced back to emerge victorious in Johannesburg, with Scott van Breda scoring 18 points in a 23–18 victory. However, this was not enough to retain their Super Rugby status, as the Lions won 44–42 on aggregate to return them to Super Rugby in 2014 at the expense of the Kings.

2014–2015 : Hiatus from Super Rugby

After the end of the 2013 Super Rugby season, the Kings lost several players to other teams. Director of Rugby Alan Solomons also left to join Edinburgh Rugby and head coach Matt Sexton later also announced that he was leaving the Kings to return to his home country New Zealand.

On 4 September 2013, SANZAR boss Greg Peters confirmed that South Africa would get a sixth Super Rugby franchise from 2016, as the competition expanded once again. This was reiterated in 2014 when SANZAR confirmed that the competition would expand to 18 teams, with teams from Argentina and Japan joining the competition.

They also agreed to sit out the 2015 season by withdrawing from the proposed promotion/relegation match at the end of 2014.

Their return to Super Rugby was beset by financial problems, with players' salaries being paid late in four consecutive months between August and November 2015. In November 2015, the South African Rugby Union took control of the Southern Kings franchise and revealed an operational plan on 4 December 2015; the plan included the appointment of  coach Deon Davids as the head coach for 2016, the identification of a fully transformed squad that they intended signing and a guarantee to pay the Southern Kings' staff and players.

2016–2017 : Return to Super Rugby

Despite a Chris Cloete try opening the scoring for the Kings, the visitors eventually won the match 43–8. Chris Cloete, Edgar Marutlulle and captain Steven Sykes were the joint-top try scorers for the Kings with four tries apiece, while fly-half Louis Fouché was the top points scorer with 81. They finished bottom of the four teams in the Africa 2 Conference, seventh in the South African Group and 17th overall, with just the Japanese Sunwolves team finishing the season with a worse record.

Their record of six wins and nine losses saw them finish bottom of the Africa 2 Conference, fifth in the South African Group – ahead of local rivals the Bulls and Cheetahs – and 11th overall. Lionel Cronjé topped their scoring charts, finishing on 136 points for the season, the fourth-highest in the competition, while winger Makazole Mapimpi scored 11 tries, a new seasonal and all-time record for the Kings and the joint-third highest in the competition.

2017–present : Pro14 and Isuzu sponsorship

In April 2017, SANZAAR announced that three clubs would be cut from Super Rugby for the 2018 Super Rugby season, with two of those teams coming from South Africa. On 1 August 2017, the European-based Pro12 announced that the competition would expand to 14 teams – being rebranded the Pro14 – and that the Cheetahs and Kings would be the teams joining the expanded tournament from the 2017–18 season onwards.

This announcement came too late to ensure squad continuity, with more than 30 players leaving the franchise. On 15 August 2017 – a fortnight before the competition started – the Kings announced that head coach Deon Davids extended his contract to lead the team in their Pro14 season, and also announced the first batch of player signings. With the team having just four training sessions and no pre-season matches going into the season, they suffered a 10–57 defeat to reigning champions Scarlets, before another loss to Irish side Connacht. They played their first Pro14 match on home soil the following week against Leinster, losing their third match in a row with the Irish side winning 31–10. After another home defeat to Italian side Zebre, the Kings embarked on another tour of Europe, but was again whitewashed, losing to the Dragons, Benetton and Glasgow Warriors. Their results showed a slight upturn upon their return to home soil; despite losing 36–43 defeat to Ulster, the Kings picked up their first log points of the season – one for a seven-point defeat and one for scoring at least four tries – and repeated their bonus point haul in their next match, a 30–34 defeat to Scarlets. The Southern Kings started their run of five consecutive home matches to end the season in spectacular fashion, beating Welsh side the  45–13 to record their first ever win in the competition.

In August 2018, car manufacturer Isuzu Motors South Africa announced a deal to sponsor the Southern Kings for the next three seasons, resulting in the team officially being rebranded as the Isuzu Southern Kings. In addition, Isuzu partnered with a consortium of black business people to purchase equity in the Southern Kings, making the team the first black-owned rugby franchise in South Africa.

Records and statistics

Summary of performances

The Southern Kings full playing record in all competitions are:

Final squad

The Final squad was:

Staff

The following coaching team was announced for the 2019–20 Pro14 season:

See also
 Rugby union in South Africa
 Super Rugby
 Pro14
 Border Bulldogs
 Eastern Province Elephants
 SWD Eagles

References

External links
 
 Official Facebook page
 Official Twitter account

 
Super Rugby teams
South African rugby union teams
Rugby clubs established in 2009
United Rugby Championship teams
Rugby union clubs disestablished in 2020
2020 disestablishments in South Africa